Inner Glow is an album by American jazz vibraphonist Bobby Hutcherson recorded in 1975 and originally released on the Japanese Blue Note label. While never issued in the U.S. the tracks were included on the Mosaic Records box set Mosaic Select 26: Bobby Hutcherson, released in 2007.

Track listing
All compositions by Bobby Hutcherson except as indicated
 "Boodaa" - 10:06 
 "Cowboy Bob" - 9:31 
 "Searchin' the Trane" - 8:04 
 "Inner Glow" (George Cables) - 7:59 
 "Roses Poses" - 7:19 
Recorded on March 24 (tracks 1, 3 & 5) and March 25 (tracks 2 & 4), 1975.

Personnel
Bobby Hutcherson - vibes
Oscar Brashear - trumpet
Thurman Green - trombone
Harold Land - tenor saxophone
Dwight Dickenson - piano
Kent Brinkley - bass
Larry Hancock - drums

References 

Blue Note Records albums
Bobby Hutcherson albums
1980 albums